Forum for the Restoration of Democracy–Kenya (FORD–Kenya) is a Kenyan political party. The party has sat in the government of Kenya once, under the National Rainbow Coalition, from 2003 to 2007, having ended forty years of one party (Kenya African National Union) rule. In April 2022, the party joined the Kenya Kwanza coalition for the August 2022 elections, and is headed by Moses Wetangula, the current speaker of the National Assembly of Kenya

History 
The history of FORD-Kenya is essentially the history of multi-party politics in Kenya. Kenya was a one-party state until December 1991, when a special conference of the ruling Kenya African National Union (KANU) agreed to introduce a multiparty political system. An umbrella political grouping, the Forum for the Restoration of Democracy (FORD), had been formed in August 1991 by six opposition leaders to fight for change in the country. The six were Jaramogi Oginga Odinga, Phillip Gachoka, Ahmed Bamahariz, Salim Ndamwe, Masinde Muliro and George Nthenge. But President Daniel arap Moi had outlawed it, its leaders were under constant surveillance by security agents, and their meetings outlawed. Intimidation only eased after sustained pressure from the United Kingdom, the United States, and Scandinavian countries.
In August 1992, due to an internal power struggle over the leadership of FORD, the party split into two factions: FORD-Asili (led by Kenneth Matiba) and FORD-Kenya (led by Oginga Odinga). FORD-Kenya performed poorly in the general elections of 1992, coming a distant third behind KANU and FORD-Asili. The reelection of President Moi and KANU, both deeply unpopular, owed much to the division of the original FORD.
Odinga died in January 1994 and was succeeded as chairman of FORD-Kenya by Michael Wamalwa Kijana. At the time, FORD-Kenya's leadership included some of the top opposition leaders in Kenya, including lawyer James Orengo, economist Professor Peter Anyang' Nyong'o, Raila Odinga (the son of Oginga Odinga), Oburu Odinga (Raila's elder brother), environmentalist, and, later on, Nobel laureate, Wangari Maathai, and many others. 
But the party was headed for yet another split. Michael Wamalwa and Raila Odinga tussled over the leadership of FORD-Kenya for 2 years. In 1997, Wamalwa beat Odinga in free and fair party elections, precipitating a devastating tribal split that the party has yet to recover from. Raila, with a sizeable number of Luo MP's, left FORD-Kenya to join the National Development Party of Kenya (NDP).  In the 1997 general elections, FORD-Kenya finished fourth, behind Raila's NDP.

General elections

2002 General elections 
Kenya's opposition political parties finally put their differences behind them in the run-up to the 2002 general elections, fielding one candidate, Mwai Kibaki, for the presidency. Kibaki defeated the KANU candidate, Uhuru Kenyatta, and formed a government of national unity. He appointed FORD-Kenya's leader, Michael Wamalwa, to be vice president and gave a number of cabinet positions to FORD-Kenya MPs.

2013 General elections 
In December 2012 it was one of four parties to enter into Coalition for Reforms and Democracy, alongside Raila Odinga's Orange Democratic Movement, Charity Ngilu's National Rainbow Coalition, and Kalonzo Musyoka's Wiper Democratic Movement – Kenya.

Change of leadership 
Michael Wamalwa Kijana died in London on 23 August 2003 after a long illness. After the funeral, FORD-Kenya elected Musikari Kombo to succeed Wamalwa, beating another FORD-Kenya MP, Dr. Mukhisa Kituyi, in the contest. With neither the charisma of Michael Wamalwa nor the crowd-pulling popularity of Raila Odinga, Kombo struggled to establish the party as an influential component of the ruling coalition. The party felt shortchanged after the death of Wamalwa, when the prized position of vice president was handed to the LDP's Moody Awori and a number of other appointments went the way of other parties. Kombo showed his mantle as the FORD-Kenya Chairman when he led his party MPs in rejecting their appointment to the newly reconstituted cabinet after the constitutional referendum of 2005. This forced President Mwai Kibaki to take Kombo and FORD-Kenya seriously and increase the number of FORD-Kenya cabinet ministers to 6 from 3 and acquire other senior civil service appointments for its party members.
In March 2007, a breakaway party known as New Ford Kenya was registered by cabinet minister Soita Shitanda. Kituyi later joined the party.
At the Kenyan general election, 2007, FORD-Kenya aligned with the newly created Party of National Unity led by President Kibaki. It ran, however, its own candidates in a number of constituencies and local authorities. The election results were very poor as with a quarter of constituencies not yet decided had FORD-Kenya holding only one seat. Kombo's tenure ended with the party suffering through numerous court cases trying to get a new leader. Eventually, Moses Wetangula became the leader of the party through a national delegates congress election.

Governing body 
As gazetted on 30th of November 2021, the Registrar of Political Parties in Kenya gave notice that FORD-Kenya made changes to its governing body.

References

External links
Kenyaweb Article: Kenya
Michael Wamalwa Kijana
2007 Manifesto
2007 Parliamentary Candidates

1992 establishments in Kenya
Political parties established in 1992
Political parties in Kenya
Social democratic parties in Africa